Marlee Scott (born January 1, 1986 in Richmond Hill, Ontario) is a Canadian country music singer and songwriter. She now resides in Nashville, Tennessee. In 2004, Scott was the winner of Corus Entertainment's Rising Country Superstar Challenge, which led to a record deal with 306 Records and the release of her first album, Souvenir, in 2005. That album saw four singles released to country radio, and her video for "I Fall in Love Too Fast" received airplay on CMT.

Scott signed a new management deal with Big Ride Management in February 2008. Big Ride Management is headed by Gerry Leiske, who previously managed Emerson Drive, and is based in Nashville, Tennessee. She released a new, self-titled album in November 2008, on independent record label Big Ride Entertainment.

Discography

Albums

Singles

Music videos

Awards and nominations

References

External links
@MarleeScott on Twitter
Official Facebook: www.Facebook/MarleeScottMusic
Big Ride Entertainment Site

YouTube channels:
Marlee Scott Official Music Videos
Marleevision: Behind-the-scenes with Marlee Scott on Youtube

1986 births
Living people
Canadian women country singers
Musicians from Alberta
Musicians from Ontario
People from Richmond Hill, Ontario
People from St. Albert, Alberta
21st-century Canadian women singers